The Prix Francoeur, or Francoeur Prize, was an award granted by the Institut de France, Academie des Sciences, Fondation Francoeur to authors of works useful to the progress of pure and applied mathematics. Preference was given to young scholars or to geometricians not yet established. It was established in 1882 and has been discontinued.

Prize winners

 1882–1888 — Emile Barbier
 1889–1890 — Maximilien Marie
 1891–1892 — Augustin Mouchot
 1893 — Guy Robin
 1894 — J. Collet
 1895 — Jules Andrade
 1896 — Alphonse Valson
 1897 — Guy Robin
 1898 — Aimé Vaschy
 1899 — Le Cordier
 1900 — Edmond Maillet
 1901 — Léonce Laugel
 1902–1904 — Emile Lemoine
 1905 — Xavier Stouff
 1906–1912 — Emile Lemoine
 1913–1914 — A. Claude
 1915 — Joseph Marty
 1916 — René Gateaux
 1917 — Henri Villat
 1918 — Paul Montel
 1919 — Georges Giraud
 1920–1921 — René Baire
 1922 — Louis Antoine
 1923 — Gaston Bertrand
 1924 — Ernest Malo
 1925 — Georges Valiron
 1926 — Gaston Julia
 1927 — Georges Cerf
 1928 — Szolem Mandelbrojt
 1929 — Paul Noaillon
 1930 — Eugène Fabry
 1931 — Jacques Herbrand
 1932 — Henri Milloux
 1933 — Paul Mentre
 1934 — Jean Favard
 1935 — André Weil
 1936 — Claude Chevalley
 1937 — Jean Leray
 1938 — Jean Dieudonné
 1939 — Marcel Brelot
 1940 — Charles Ehresmann
 1941 — Paul Vincensini
 1942 — Paul Dubreil
 1943 — René de Possel
 1944 — No award
 1945 — No award
 1946 — Laurent Schwartz
 1952 — No award
 1957 — Jean-Pierre Serre
 1962 — Jean-Louis Koszul
 1967 — Jacques Neveu
 1972 — Pierre Gabriel
 1977 — Jean-Claude Tougeron
 1982 — François Laudenbach
 1987 — Jean-Louis Loday
 1992 — Georges Skandalis

See also

 List of mathematics awards

References 

Mathematics awards
French awards
1882 establishments in France